B roads are numbered routes in Great Britain of lesser importance than A roads. See the article Great Britain road numbering scheme for the rationale behind the numbers allocated.

3 digits

4 digits (40xx)

4 digits (41xx)

4 digits (42xx)

4 digits (43xx)

4 digits (44xx)

4 digits (45xx)

4 digits (46xx)

References

4
 4